Nirupama Borgohain (née Tamuli; ; 1932– ) is an Indian journalist and novelist in the Assamese language. She is a Sahitya Akademi award winner, best known for her novel Abhiyatri. In the year 2015, she decided to return her Sahitya Akademi award in protest against the rising intolerance in the society. She was a recipient of the Assam Valley Literary Award.

Biography
Nirupama Tamuli was born in Guwahati, Assam on 17 March 1932, to Jadab Tamuli, a clerk in the Income Tax office, and Kashiswari Tamuli. She attended Cotton College, Guwahati and Calcutta University, from where she received post-graduate degrees in English literature and Assamese.

In 1958, Tamuli married the writer and journalist Homen Borgohain. They had two sons. In 1977, they separated.

Career

Journalism
Borgohain worked as a lecturer of English at various colleges, as well as editor of Saptahik Sanchipat and Chitrangada.

Between 1968 and 1980, Borgohain worked at the weekly magazine Saptahik Neelachal, which she was responsible for developing into one of the most influential in Assam. From 1979–85, there was a socio-political movement in Assam against the influx of alleged illegal immigrants from Bangladesh, and several camps were attacked by the activists. Borgohain's investigation into these attacks resulted in essays that led to her controversial sacking from the magazine.

Literary
Borgohain began publishing short stories under the pseudonym Neelima Devi in the journal Ramdhenu. Some of her works are Anek Akas (Many Skies, 1961), Jalachabi (Movie, 1966), Sunyatar Kavya (Poems of Emptiness, 1969).

Borgohain's first novel Sei Nadi Niravadhi (The River Keeps Flowing) was published in 1963. This intertwined the story of a woman with the fate of a river, while Ejan Budha Manuh (An Old Man, 1966) centred on the relationship between a father and son, laying bare the tensions fraying it owing to an inter-caste marriage.

Her feminist novels Dinor Pisot Dinor (1968), Anya Jivan (1986) and Champavati were noted for their sympathetic portrayals of women facing up to oppressive social mores and the patriarchy. Meanwhile, the degradation faced by the indigent, owing to rural migration as well as the breakdown of the old established social orders, was acutely described in her Dinor Pisot Dinor as well as  Bhabhishat Rongat Surya (1980). Iparor Ghor Siparor Ghor (Houses of This Side and That, 1979) again depicted the migration of rural folks to urban areas in search of a better life; the tale was told in a naturalistic form, realistic but suffused with pessimism.

Borgohain's Abhiyatri (1995) was a biographical novel of the life of an Assamese freedom fighter, feminist and social activist, Chandraprava Saikiani. This won her the Sahitya Akademi literary award the following year, and is considered one of her finest novels.

Selected works

Novels
 Aei Nodi Niravadhi (1963)
 Dinor Pisot Din (1968)
 Antah Shrota (1969)
 Hridoy Eta Nirjon Dweep (1970) 
 Samanya Asamanya (1971)
 Cactus Phul (1976)
 Iparor Ghor Siparor Ghor (1979) 
 Bhabishyot Ronga Surjya (1980) 
 Anya Jibon (1986)
 Champabati (1990)
 
 Barasun (2011)

Short stories

Autobiography
 Vishwas Aru Sanshayar Majedi

Awards and recognition
Borgohain has received numerous accolades for her literary achievements.
 Asam Sahitya Sabha's Hem Baruah Award, 1983
 Asam Sahitya Sabha's Basanti Devi Award, 1988 
 Sahitya Akademi Award, 1996
 Assam Valley Literary Award, 2004
 Asam Sahitya Sabha's Prajnaratna, 2012

References

Bibliography

 
 
 
 
 
 
 
 

Indian women novelists
Living people
1932 births
Assamese-language writers
Recipients of the Sahitya Akademi Award in Assamese
Cotton College, Guwahati alumni
Recipients of the Assam Valley Literary Award
Journalists from Assam
20th-century Indian novelists
20th-century Indian women writers
Indian women short story writers
20th-century Indian short story writers
Women writers from Assam
Writers from Guwahati
Novelists from Assam
Assam Valley Literary Award